The Milliy Stadium a.k.a Bunyodkor Stadium is a football stadium in the city of Tashkent — the capital of Uzbekistan. Located in Chilanzar District of Tashkent, on Bunyodkor Avenue. It seats 34,000 spectators, thus becoming the second largest stadium in Uzbekistan after the Pakhtakor Stadium, which seats 35,000 spectators. It is the home arena of the FC Bunyodkor and Uzbekistan national football team.

From its opening in September 2012 until June 2018, the stadium was called "Bunyodkor Stadium". In June 2018, the stadium was renamed "Milliy", which translated from the Uzbek language means "National", that is, "National Stadium" (Uzbek: Milliy stadioni).

Construction of the stadium began in January 2009, at the site of the demolished  MHSK Stadium, which accommodated 16,500 spectators. Its original shape was designed by GMP Architekten, an architectural firm based in Germany. The construction of the stadium was completed in August 2012.

The stadium was solemnly opened on September 28, 2012, with the participation of the first President of the Republic of Uzbekistan — Islam Karimov, as well as the stadium full of fans and spectators. The grand opening of the stadium was accompanied by songs by famous singers of the Uzbek pop, and a friendly match was held between the Tashkent football clubs Bunyodkor and Pakhtakor (3:3).

The first official match at the Bunyodkor Stadium was played on March 26, 2013 in the match between the national teams of Uzbekistan and Lebanon as part of the 2014 FIFA World Cup qualification, in which the national team of Uzbekistan won with a score of 1:0. Subsequently, the Bunyodkor Stadium became the main home stadium for the Uzbekistan national team. Prior to this, the main home stadium of the national team of the country was another Tashkent stadium — Pakhtakor Stadium.

On June 11, 2018 by the decision of the executive committee of the Uzbekistan Football Association, the name was changed to "Milliy Stadium" (National Stadium).

The stadium is located in the Chilanzar District of the city of Tashkent, on Bunyodkor Avenue. It holds 34,000 spectators, has two tiers (floors) and more than 50 sectors. There are VIP (about 50 places / cabins) and CIP (700 places) lodges. There are several dozen places for wheelchair users. The stadium has a restaurant and café bars, fast food establishments, toilets, fitness clubs, and other facilities and points.

There are two large monitors, a modern lighting system — 3000 lux, a modern audio system, four changing rooms for football players and team members, a conference room and other auxiliary rooms and rooms. Under the stadium there is a parking lot for 350 cars. The stadium also houses the Museum of the History of Uzbekistan's Football, which includes trophies of the Bunyodkor football club, as well as other objects, photographs and exhibits about Uzbekistan's football. The field of the stadium corresponds to the modern world standards. The size of the field is 105 by 68 meters. There are drainage and field heating.

The Bunyodkor Stadium complex occupies 37 hectares of land, and in addition to the main stadium, it has seven more modern fields. The complex also houses a youth football school, a swimming pool and other sports facilities, as well as other infrastructure facilities. In the evening, the stadium facade is illuminated by a lighting system called the "Flame of the East."

Gallery

External links
 Information about this stadium in the FC Bunyodkor official site — fcbunyodkor.com
 World Stadium Profile

Football venues in Uzbekistan
FC Bunyodkor
Uzbekistan national football team